In enzymology, a 5-dehydro-2-deoxygluconokinase is an enzyme that catalyzes the chemical reaction

ATP + 5-dehydro-2-deoxy-D-gluconate  ADP + 6-phospho-5-dehydro-2-deoxy-D-gluconate

Thus, the two substrates of this enzyme are ATP and 5-dehydro-2-deoxy-D-gluconate, whereas its two products are ADP and 6-phospho-5-dehydro-2-deoxy-D-gluconate.

This enzyme belongs to the family of transferases, specifically those transferring phosphorus-containing groups (phosphotransferases) with an alcohol group as acceptor.  The systematic name of this enzyme class is ATP:5-dehydro-2-deoxy-D-gluconate 6-phosphotransferase. Other names in common use include 5-keto-2-deoxygluconokinase, 5-keto-2-deoxyglucono kinase (phosphorylating), and DKH kinase.  This enzyme participates in inositol metabolism.

References

 

EC 2.7.1
Enzymes of unknown structure